The 1926 Colorado Agricultural Aggies football team represented Colorado Agricultural College (now known as Colorado State University) in the Rocky Mountain Conference (RMC) during the 1926 college football season.  In their 16th season under head coach Harry W. Hughes, the Aggies compiled a 6–2–1 record (5–2 against conference opponents), tied for fourth place in the RMC, and outscored opponents by a total of 149 to 44.

Schedule

References

Colorado Agricultural
Colorado State Rams football seasons
Colorado Agricultural Aggies football